Emergency medical services in Russia is a type of medical assistance provided to citizens in cases of accident, illnesses, injuries, poisonings, and other conditions requiring urgent medical intervention. These services are typically provided by a city or regional government, public emergency hospital, or the Disaster Medical Service. The emergency number for dialing an ambulance in Russia is 03 or the generic European 112.

Overview 
An ambulance is composed of any combination of doctors, nurses and feldshers (a combination of a physicians assistant and paramedic), with ambulance drivers selected from an agency that trains them as professional drivers. Ambulances are staffed at minimum by a nurse and feldsher. The driver’s task is only driving and does not have any medical qualifications or even specialized driver's training.

System configuration

Ambulance Types 
 Class 1
 A non-emergency patient transport vehicle used to shuttle patients between hospitals, clinics, and other medical facilities. 
 Class 2
 Emergency ambulance staffed with feldshers trained and operating in Basic Life Support (BLS).
 Class 3
 Specialty Ambulance. In addition to the basic ambulance teams, various types of specialty units can respond, depending on what advanced patient care is needed. The most common is a "reanimobil", or a "resuscitation ambulance". These are Advanced Life Support (ALS) units that respond to cardiac arrest, stroke, severe trauma, and other severe medical emergencies. Other types of specialty ambulances include cardiac, surgical, OB, pediatric, intensive care, and respiratory. All of these units carry state-of-the-art equipment, a specialty emergency physician, and some combination of a feldsher and nurse. These specialty ambulances are typically painted yellow to distinguish them from the generic white emergency ambulances.

Other emergency services 
 Rescue Service
 А technical rescue brigade provided by a city or regional government or EMERCOM depending on location. These units respond to motor vehicle accidents, building collapses, water rescues, and rope rescue situations. The teams extricate or rescue the victim from the dangerous situation, stabilize the victim, and hand them over to the ambulance.

See also 
 State of emergency in Russia
 Martial law in Russia
 Russian System of Disaster Management
 Healthcare in Russia
 Main Directorate of Special Programs of the President of the Russian Federation
 Federal Agency for State Reserves (Russia)

References 

Healthcare in Russia
Russia
Emergency services in Russia